Santervás de Campos is a municipality located in the province of Valladolid, Castile and León, Spain. , the municipality has a population of 137  inhabitants and is known as the birthplace of Juan Ponce de León.

Puerto Rico Governor Luis Fortuño, during a trade mission to Spain, presided over a ceremony there on January 21, 2011, commemorating the Quincentennial of the Governorship of Ponce de León, the United States territory's first Governor and discoverer of Florida and the continental United States, in which a statue of that municipality's famous explorer was unveiled.

Demographics

Notable natives and residents

 Juan Ponce de León, Spanish explorer, one of the first explorers of Florida, and conqueror & first governor of Puerto Rico.
 Francisco de Villagra (1511 - 1563): conquistador and three-time governor of Chile.
 Bartolomé Santos de Risoba (1582 - 1657): Bishop of Almería, León y Sigüenza.

See also
Cuisine of the province of Valladolid

References

Municipalities in the Province of Valladolid